Nesameletidae is a family of mayflies in the order Ephemeroptera. There are at least three genera and about eight described species in Nesameletidae.

Genera
These three genera belong to the family Nesameletidae:
 Ameletoides Tillyard, 1933 – Australia
 Metamonius Eaton, 1885 – South America
 Nesameletus Tillyard, 1933 – New Zealand

References

Further reading

 

 

Mayflies
Insect families